Stamboul is a 1932 British drama film directed by Dimitri Buchowetzki and starring Warwick Ward, Rosita Moreno, Margot Grahame, and Garry Marsh. It was shot at the Elstree Studios outside London. It was released by the British division of Paramount Pictures. The film's sets were designed by the art director Heinrich Richter, Hermann Warm and R. Holmes Paul. The film is based on the novel L'homme qui assasina (1906) by Claude Farrère and on a play by Pierre Frondaie. Buchowetski also co-directed El hombre que asesino with Fernando Gomis, the Spanish-language version of the film, also released by Paramount.

Premise
In the lead-up to the First World War, a French military attaché falls in love with the wife of a prominent German in Stamboul (the central part of Constantinople, now known in entirety as Istanbul) in the Ottoman Empire.

Cast
 Warwick Ward as Col André de Sevigne
 Rosita Moreno as Baroness von Strick
 Margot Grahame as Countess Elsa Talven
 Henry Hewitt as Baron von Strick
 Garry Marsh as Prince Cernuwitz
 Alan Napier as Bouchier
 Abraham Sofaer as Mahmed Pasha
 Stella Arbenina as Mme. Bouchier
 Annie Esmond as Nurse
 Eric Pavitt as Franz

See also
The Right to Love (1920)
The Man Who Murdered (1931)

References

External links
 
 
 

1932 films
1932 drama films
Films directed by Dimitri Buchowetzki
British drama films
British films based on plays
British multilingual films
British black-and-white films
1932 multilingual films
Films scored by Percival Mackey
Films shot at British International Pictures Studios
1930s English-language films
1930s British films
Paramount Pictures films